Misfit 3: De Finale is a 2020 Dutch family film and is a sequel to the 2017 film Misfit and the 2019 film Misfit 2. Unlike the previous installments, it skipped cinemas and was directly distributed on Netflix.

Reception 
Het Parool gave the film a low review and said it was as cliché-riddled as its predecessors. However, Netflix also announced that the movie would get a spin-off television series.

References

External links 
 

2020 films
Dutch children's films
2020s Dutch-language films
Dutch-language Netflix original films
Dutch sequel films